A massage parlor (American English) or massage parlour (Canadian/British English) is a place where massage services are provided for a fee. In the 19th century, the term began to be used in English as a euphemism for a brothel.

Context
In 1894 the British Medical Association (BMA) inquired into the education and practice of massage practitioners in London, and found that prostitution was commonly associated with unskilled workers and debt, often working with forged qualifications. In response, legitimate massage workers formed the Society of Trained Masseuses (now known as the Chartered Society of Physiotherapy), with an emphasis on high academic standards and a medical model for massage training.

There is a grey area and ambiguity as to when an ordinary massage becomes sexual when it comes to individuals with sexual interests such as tripsophilia (arousal from massage), tripsolagnophilia, partialism, autofetishism or organofact, who may feel that the massage of the entire body or any ordinary body parts unrelated to typical erogenous zones are associated with eroticism and sensuality.

Canada

A 2013 Toronto Life article about massage parlours in Toronto described a "thriving" industry. It profiled one massage parlour, which promoted its services and masseuses with a website. It had private rooms with massage tables, mirrors and showers. After the client paid a $40 door fee (this went to the facility, not the masseuse) and showered (a city health requirement), the masseuse informed the client about "the [unwritten] menu"—the "unlisted special services". For an additional $40, the masseuse would perform the massage naked and masturbate the client to orgasm. For $60, the client receiving the massage and being masturbated could also touch the masseuse's body. Some clients requested oral sex, sexual intercourse, or fetish activities for an extra price, but not all masseuses provided these services. For $80, the client could get a "body slide", where the masseuse put massage oil on her body, lay on the client and slid back and forth (without penetration). The 29-year-old masseuse interviewed for the article made $2,000 per week (three eight-hour days) in fees and tips.

Italy
In Italy, massage parlours can be fronts for prostitution. Advertisements for massage parlours are listed in newspapers, in some cases offering "Japanese" or "Oriental" massage. Viva Lain, one of Italy's largest chains of massage parlours, was raided by the police in 2003.

Malaysia
Since the end of the 20th century an expansion in prostitution in Malaysia has resulted in massage parlors being established across the country. Malaysian massage parlors often call themselves spas, salons, or health centres, and many offer erotic massages and "happy endings".

Nepal
In Kathmandu's tourist district of Thamel, massage parlours typically advertise Thai massage, Ayurvedic massage or Nepalese "special massage". Some offer legitimate massage, while others are sex establishments. Prostitution in Nepal is illegal so the owners of such  massage parlours do not explicitly solicit sex and the paying of police bribes is a customary part of the operation.

Thailand

Thailand is known for its unique spa experiences and in particular its healthy and non-sexual traditional Thai massage therapy. However, the term "massage parlor" in Thailand is commonly associated with sexual massage.

In 1996, foreign women made up the majority of prostitutes from 40 sex establishments in 18 border provinces that were actually brothels masquerading as karaoke bars, restaurants and traditional massage parlours. In some venues, there were no Thai women at all. In mid-1997, an increasing number of young girls, more than 60% of whom were under 18, were entering Thailand through the Mae Sai checkpoint into massage parlors and brothels.

The legal difference between a "spa" and a "massage parlour" is unclear. The Federation of Thai Spa Associations (FTSPA) in 2016 urged authorities to clamp down on sexual services offered at some massage parlours. The FTSPA maintains that influential figures have used legal loopholes to open "pretty spas" or massage parlours where tourists can buy sexual services.

United Kingdom
In the United Kingdom, prostitution itself is legal but activities such as pimping and owning or managing a brothel are not. However, the laws are not always strictly enforced. Many brothels in cities such as Manchester, London and Cardiff operate through legitimate businesses which are licensed as "massage parlours" and operate under that name. Police often turn a blind eye to such establishments. Massage parlours are sometimes advertised in newspapers, but a newspaper that carries advertising for a brothel under the guise of a massage parlour may be liable to prosecution for money-laundering offences under the Proceeds of Crime Act 2002. The Newspaper Society's guidelines suggest that their members (the majority of local newspapers) refuse to carry advertisements for sexual services. The advice also warns publishers that massage parlours can disguise illegal offers of sexual services and it suggests checking qualifications to ensure the advertised service is legitimate. Newspaper companies often adopt a policy of refusing all advertisements for massage parlours.

In 2005, it was reported that, in Manchester, there were around 80 "massage parlours" that were fronts for prostitution, and that the police ignored those establishments, focusing instead on reducing street prostitution. On 12 October 2005, the Manchester Evening News reported that "a self-confessed pimp walked free from court after a judge was told police had 'turned a blind eye' to organised prostitution in massage parlours in Manchester."

In December 2007, the Manchester Evening News removed all advertisements for massage parlours from its personal columns following a meeting between ministers and newspaper and advertising industry representatives. It also followed comments by Harriet Harman, Minister for Women and Equality, in the House of Commons on 25 October that some local newspapers were promoting slavery by running sex adverts for foreign women.

United States
Massage parlors in the United States have been linked to prostitution since the nineteenth century. In 2019 it was reported that the Polaris Project estimated there were around 9,000 massage parlors in the US providing sexual services. Most of the staff are Chinese women. The country's larger cities typically have hundreds, and they are often present in small towns.  

Between 1980 and 2009, massage parlors in Rhode Island (also known there as "spas") were known to be involved in prostitution. Prostitution in Rhode Island was legal at that time as long as it was "behind closed doors". The 2009 documentary film Happy Endings? follows women who worked in the Asian massage parlors of Rhode Island. It focuses on "full service" massage parlors, although "rub and tug" massage parlors (where only handjobs are offered) are also covered.

As of 2010, there were an estimated 525 massage parlors in New Jersey acting as fronts for the prostitution industry.

An ongoing study of prostitution in New York City by the Sociology Department of Columbia University found that, between 1991 and 2010, the rise of the Internet and mobile phones "have enabled some sex workers to professionalize their trade", with a shift from street walking to "indoor" markets (including massage parlors and escort agencies), a geographical change in the concentration of sex work and the growth of a more expensive luxury market.  In January 2011, an investigation by Time Out New York found New York City massage parlors charging a "house fee" (which is usually paid, up front to the parlor's mama-san) of $60 to $100 per visit, with an extra tip for the sex workers (usually around $40) for a massage and a basic "happy ending" (or manual stimulation of the penis until orgasm). Most of the massage parlors reviewed were very strict about the female masseuse not being touched by the male client, but, in some parlors, further contact could be negotiated.

In many large US cities there are Asian massage parlours, some advertising traditional Thai massage. In some cases these establishments are fronts for prostitution. As of 2005, more than forty Asian massage parlors (mostly Korean) operated as fronts for in-call brothels in Washington, D.C., and each earned an average of $1.2 million a year. More than 200 other massage parlors (that did not openly advertise and were operated largely out of private homes and apartments) serving mainly Mestizo clients made an average of at least $800,000 a year.

Sex acts performed at massage parlors can range from a basic "happy ending" to oral sex or "full service". Some, mostly Asian, massage parlors offer a naked "table shower" or an "Asian body slide" as well as access to a sauna before a massage and/or any sexual activity takes place.

During the 2000s publications in major metropolitan areas of the US were under pressure not to advertise massage parlor operations. After the Fight Online Sex Trafficking Act became law on 11 April 2018 the classified advertising website Craigslist removed all of their personal advertisements. Another classified advertising website, Backpage, was shut down by federal officials during the same month. The closure of Backpage substantially benefited the massage parlor review website RubMaps which covers Asian massage parlors in the US. The site was under investigation by US authorities in 2019, a process made more difficult by the site's corporate structures and domain name having moved to Europe.

Law enforcement agencies in the US attempt to shut down or fine massage parlor establishments that break federal, state or local laws. The penalty for breaking the law in these instances can be as high as life imprisonment in some cases, especially those that involve human trafficking.

See also
 Human trafficking
 Mama-san
 Prostitution law

References

External links
 "Massage parlor" definition in Merriam-Webster Dictionary
 "Massage parlor" definition in Oxford Advanced American Dictionary
 Washington Post is urged to stop accepting advertisements for massage parlors

Massage
Sex industry